Mazanów  is a village in the administrative district of Gmina Józefów nad Wisłą, within Opole Lubelskie County, Lublin Voivodeship, in eastern Poland.

References

The entry in  Słownik geograficzny Królestwa Polskiego i innych krajów słowiańskich for Mazanów (Vol VI, p. 182) and its following page gives a statistical picture of Mazanów in the late nineteenth century.

Mazanów is a quiet agricultural village that stretches along the road from Prawno to Boiska.  Houses and farm buildings/stables front on either side of the road and the related fields stretch behind them, mostly on the south side. A portion of the land on the north side of the road beyond the house yards, and running for about 50 meters up to the left bank of the River Wyznica, serves as common pasture.  The houses and farm buildings are typical of the rural architecture of this area of Poland, some being over 100 years old and still quite functional for their intended purposes.
A collection of pictures taken in and around Mazanów and posted on stad.com can be see here.

Villages in Opole Lubelskie County